This article provides a list of commercially available software-defined radio receivers.

See also
 List of communications receivers

References

Telecommunications lists
Amateur radio-related lists